Twinkletoes is a children's fiction book series by Thomas Koh and Titian. The series is published by Angsana Books, Flame Of The Forest Publishing. 19 books have been released so far since the first book A Star Is Born was published in 2008.

Authors 
Thomas Koh and Titian are the authors of the series. 

Thomas Koh, a sports correspondent with The Straits Times for 10 years, writes the stories, and Titian, a world class artist whose works have been displayed in top art galleries across Europe and the US, does all the illustrations.

About the series 
The title of the book series, Twinkletoes, drew its inspiration from Chia Boon Leong, a Singaporean footballer who was nicknamed "Twinkletoes" in the 1950s for his amazing footwork and ball control. 

It features Leandro Giovanni Ang Soon Huat as its main character and follows the adventures of Leandro and his football team from Morrison High School. School principal Mr Billy Chin, and Leandro's friends, Jasmine, Hock Ann and Augustine are some of the other characters. 

Along with the illustrations, words are emphasized with playful typography. The books also include inserts such as fun facts and jokes with the aim of entertaining young children.

Books 
The latest book in the Twinkletoes series is Twinkletoes #19, Undercover Angel.

References

External links
 Twinkletoes on the Flame Of The Forest website 

Singaporean short story collections
Works published under a pseudonym
Singaporean children's literature
Series of children's books